Vilho Olavi Tervasmäki (11 July 1915, Metsämaa - 15 July 2010) was a colonel on the Finnish General Staff, and later a Doctor of Political Science and war historian.

He was born in the Grand Duchy of Finland, Russian Empire, to Oscar Anselmi Tervasmäki and Lydia Alexandra Ali-Jaukkari.

References

1915 births
2010 deaths
People from Loimaa
People from Turku and Pori Province (Grand Duchy of Finland)
20th-century Finnish historians
Finnish military personnel